Adrián Marcelo Spörle (born 13 July 1995) is an Argentine professional footballer who plays as a left-back or left midfielder. He previously played for Banfield in Argentina and Dundee United in Scotland.

Career

Banfield
Spörle, after joining their ranks in 2008, began his senior career with Banfield in 2014, making his debut on 7 June in the club's final match of their 2013–14 Primera B Nacional-winning campaign against Unión Santa Fe. He made his continental debut in August 2016 against San Lorenzo in the Copa Sudamericana, prior to scoring his first goal on 19 November in the Primera División versus Arsenal de Sarandí.

Dundee United
On 13 June 2019, after one goal in sixty-nine games for Banfield, Spörle left for Scottish football after agreeing a move to Championship side Dundee United; penning a three-year contract. His unofficial bow came in a Brechin City friendly on 5 July.

Spörle made his competitive debut for Dundee United on 12 July, playing forty-five minutes of a Scottish League Cup group stage loss to Heart of Midlothian. On his second appearance in the same competition, Spörle netted his opening goal in a 3–0 victory over Cowdenbeath on 19 July. He didn't feature in any of the club's first four Championship fixtures, instead he played for the reserves in the SPFL Reserve League. Spörle's first league appearance belatedly arrived on 21 September, as he came off the bench to replace Louis Appéré in a 2–1 home win over Arbroath. Spörle struggled to learn English in his early months. In January 2020, Spörle scored his first league goal during a win away to Partick Thistle and netted on his Scottish Cup debut away to Hibernian.

After the club won promotion as champions at the end of 2019–20, Spörle scored his first Scottish top-flight goal on 19 September in a home win over St Mirren. That was followed by further goals in 2020–21 against Livingston, Kilmarnock and Aberdeen as he began playing as a left midfielder.

Personal life
Spörle holds dual nationality through his German grandfather.

Career statistics

Honours
Banfield
Primera B Nacional: 2013–14

Dundee United
Championship: 2019–20

References

External links
 

1995 births
Living people
People from Neuquén
Argentine people of German descent
Argentine footballers
Association football defenders
Argentine expatriate footballers
Expatriate footballers in Scotland
Argentine expatriate sportspeople in Scotland
Primera Nacional players
Argentine Primera División players
Scottish Professional Football League players
Club Atlético Banfield footballers
Dundee United F.C. players